Thrimshing Gewog (Dzongkha: ཁྲིམས་ཤིང་) is a gewog (village block) of Trashigang District, Bhutan. Thrimshing Gewog, along with Kangpara Gewog, comprises Thrimshing Dungkhag (sub-district)

References

Gewogs of Bhutan
Trashigang District